HSwMS Capella (T123) was a Swedish Navy Spica-class, torpedo-armed, fast attack craft (FAC).

Design 
The hull was made of steel, unlike some other contemporary designs which used plywood. Although the boat had a relatively small hull and displacement, this provided a stable platform. The Bridge and Operations Room were located at the rolling and stamping centre of the ship which further improved stability for the crew especially in high seas. The boats were fitted with a NBC support system where the hull could be closed down in the event of having to operate in a nuclear fall-out area.

Construction and career 
The vessel was one of three constructed in the 1960s by Götaverken AB on Hisingen, the other two being HSwMS Spica (T121) and HSwMS Sirius (T122). Three similar vessels were built by Karlskronavarvet. She was launched on 26 April 1966.

The vessel was taken out of service on 1 November 1989.

References 

Ships of the Swedish Navy
1966 ships
Hisingen
Ships built in Gothenburg
Spica-class torpedo boats (Sweden)

de:Spica-Klasse
it:Classe Spica (motocannoniera)